Édouard Delberghe (4 October 1935 – 2 September 1994) was a French professional racing cyclist. He rode in eight editions of the Tour de France.

References

External links
 

1935 births
1994 deaths
French male cyclists
Sportspeople from Nord (French department)
Cyclists from Hauts-de-France